The 1991 Gael Linn Cup, the most important representative competition for elite level participants in the women's team field sport of camogie, was won by Leinster, who defeated Munster in the final, played at O'Toole Park.

Arrangements
Leinster defeated Ulster at Navan, Munster got a walkover from Connacht. Leinster defeated Munster 5–12 to 0–7 in the final with Angela Downey scoring 3–4 and Carmel O'Byrne 2–1, including the third-minute goal that set the tone for the match.
The Irish Press reported But for some brilliant goalkeeping by Munster goalkeeper Trish O'Grady the score could have been doubled.

Gael Linn Trophy
Ulster defeated Leinster 4–9 to 0–8 at Navan. In the other semi-final and Munster had a walkover from Connacht. Sarah Ann McNicholl, Mary Black, Rosie Butler and Margaret Carroll scored Ulster's goals in the final as Ulster defeated Munster by 4–5 to 0–6, using eight of Down's All-Ireland junior winning team.

Final stages

Junior Final

|}

References

External links
 Camogie Association

1991 in camogie
1991
Cam